On Air is a live album by the Rolling Stones released on 1 December 2017. The standard versions of the album contain 18 live and studio recordings of the band aired on the BBC in 1963–1965. Deluxe editions of the album contain an additional 14 tracks. It emerged 20 years after initial newspaper reports that such an album could be forthcoming.

Background 
On Air is a compilation album containing live in the studio performances by the Rolling Stones that were broadcast on various BBC radio shows from 1963 to 1965, including blues and rock 'n' roll covers and early Jagger/Richards hits such as "The Last Time" and "(I Can't Get No) Satisfaction". The album was released in multiple formats, including CD, double-CD deluxe edition, heavyweight vinyl and special limited-edition coloured vinyl. The release follows that of a coffee table book by Richard Havers, which shares the same title.

The standard versions of the album contain 18 tracks, while the deluxe editions contain 32 tracks. Eight of the tracks have never been recorded or released commercially by the band.  The quality of the individual recordings varies considerably, with some being recorded in mono, and others in stereo. Despite this, the Los Angeles Times considered many of the tracks to be "crisp, clean and potent".

Critical reception 
The album received a favourable Metacritic score of 84, with Uncut calling it a "essentially [a] sequel" to the band's previous album, Blue & Lonesome, which was released in December 2016. Uncut also stated that On Air captures the "full flowering" of the Jagger/Richards songwriting relationship. The Los Angeles Times considered the album to be comparable to similar, previously released BBC recordings made by the Beatles during the period. Robert Christgau wrote in Vice: "Billed 'R&B' as they started playing out in 1963, the Stones were catchier and quicker than blues, and on these 32 radio transcriptions they sound like the premier bar band of their time if not ever. Where Blue & Lonesome is a sodden thing – many old rockers have recorded sharper, spunkier, wiser music – this collection proves what world-beaters they were even before they got serious about songwriting."

Track listing

Personnel
Musicians
Mick Jagger – vocals, harmonica
Keith Richards – guitar, backing vocals
Brian Jones – guitar, harmonica
Bill Wyman – bass, backing vocals
Charlie Watts – drums
Ian Stewart – piano on "Down the Road a Piece", "Everybody Needs Somebody to Love"
Production
Engineering: Chris Bolster, Lewis Jones, John Barrett, Paul Pritchard
Demixing: James Clarke
Mastering: Alex Wharton
Text: Richard Havers
Design: Studio Fury
Cover image: Hulton Archive

Charts

References 

2017 compilation albums
The Rolling Stones compilation albums
BBC Radio recordings